The Inner Me is the debut full-length studio album by EDM producer, remixer, and DJ Ashley Wallbridge which was released on March 9, 2012 on Armada Music. The album was written and recorded over the course of 1.5 years. The album features new collaborations from artists such as Kobalt Infusion, Audrey Gallagher, and Matias Lehtola along with returning collaborations with artists such as Andy Moor and Elleah.

Track listing

References

2012 albums